The Samsung Gear Sport is a smartwatch developed by Samsung Electronics. The Gear Sport was released at Samsung Galaxy Unpacked in 2017.

Specifications

References 

Products introduced in 2017
Smartwatches
Samsung wearable devices